Demoncy is an American black metal band formed in 1989 in Sylva, North Carolina by musician Ixithra. They are known to be one of the first American Black Metal bands.

History
The band originally formed in 1989 as a solo project by Ixithra as an outlet to express darkness through skilled and creative art. With several side projects and pseudonyms, he has been known as Wicked Warlock Of Demonic Blasphemy and Lord Of The Sylvan Shadows. The music is regarded as both otherworldly and demonic.

In 1992, Ixithra joined the USBM band Profanatica in the role of guitar player. Displeased with the sound of their new album on which he performed, Ixithra set an industrial magnet to the master tapes in a rage, destroying the entire creation. He terminated the relationship immediately and reformed Demoncy.

It was with the 1999 release of Joined In Darkness, that Demoncy was cemented in black metal history. Regarded by many as the finest example of USBM ever produced  The band toured the US and Europe and were featured in several metal music festivals.

Throughout the several versions of Demoncy, Ixithra has fired his entire band instantly for not displaying professional musicianship and the darkness required to perform within the Black Metal genre.

Significance  
Demoncy is credited as early practitioners of black metal in the United States, who did not imitate the popularized Early Norwegian black metal scene.

Style and ideology
Demoncy is known for keeping away from the commercial masses, putting a focus on the mysteries of the occult and the theme of keeping the purity of darkness in the music's design.

Song lyrics are centered on occult and magical themes.

Not limiting themselves only to Satanism or similarly popular paganist thinking, the band are fiercely anti-collectivist. There is a focus on elements of atmospheric and ethereal horror, nihilism and individualism.

Members

Current
Ixithra
VJS
Scorpios Androctonus

Former

Bass
Necreon
Neptersu
Xelac

Drums
Vorthrus

Guitar
Aeldeost
Drathrul
Elsifer
Grymoreth 
Maldis
Zyuhlniv

Lyricist
Vetharanyn

Vocals
Diabolicus
Horidus
Synvorlath

Discography

Studio albums
 Faustian Dawn (1993, self-released cassette; 1995 CD, So It Is Done Productions))
 Within The Sylvan Realms Of Frost (1999, So It Is Done Productions) 
 Joined in Darkness (1999, Baphomet Records)
 Empire Of The Fallen Angel (2003, Blood, Fire, Death Records)
 Enthroned is the Night (2012, Forever Plagued Records)
  Empire of the Fallen Angel (Eternal Black Dominion) (2015, Forever Plagued Records)

Demos
 "Impure Blessings (Dark Angel of the Four Wings)" (1991, cassette, self-released)
 "Hypocrisy Of The Accursed Heavens" (1994, cassette, self-released)
 "Ascension Of A Star Long Since Fallen" (1995, cassette, self-released)
 "The Dawn Of Eternal Damnation" (1996, self-released)
 "Commencement Of The Dark Crusades" (1996, self-released)

DVDs
 Demoncy Live (2003)
 Gathering Of Shadows (2006)

References

American black metal musical groups
Musical groups established in 1989